December 2014

See also

References

 12
December 2014 events in the United States